SGSV may refer to:

 Svalbard Global Seed Vault, a secure seedbank on the Norwegian island of Spitsbergen
 Samsung Galaxy S5, an Android smartphone produced by Samsung Electronics